WVPG is a public radio formatted broadcast radio station licensed to Bluefield, West Virginia, serving Parkersburg in West Virginia and Marietta in Ohio.  WVPG is owned and operated by West Virginia Educational Broadcasting Authority.

References

External links
West Virginia Public Broadcasting Online

NPR member stations
VPG